The 1985 British National Track Championships were a series of track cycling competitions held from 1–10 August 1985 at the Leicester Velodrome. The Championships were hindered by heavy rain which delayed many events. The national sprint team coach and former rider Eddie Soens died after suffering a heart attack during the Championships.

Medal summary

Men's Events

Women's Events

References

1985 in British sport
August 1985 sports events in the United Kingdom